The Beaufort Hurdle was a National Hunt Listed hurdle race in England which was open to horses aged five years only. 
It was run at Chepstow over a distance of 2 miles ½ furlong (3,319 metres), and was scheduled to take place each year in early March.

The race was first run in 1971, as the Player's No. 6 National Hurdle Final, and was run for the last time in March 1996.

Winners

 The 1972 running took place at Towcester.

References
Racing Post
 

Tipsterchallenge.com Beaufort Hurdle

National Hunt hurdle races
Chepstow Racecourse
Discontinued horse races